Feisal was an association football club based in Mombasa, Kenya. In 1965 the team has won the Kenyan Premier League and played its home games at the Apostle Grounds.

History

Performance in CAF competitions

References

External links

Football clubs in Kenya